Now! is the second album by the free jazz collective quartet Other Dimensions In Music, composed of trumpeter Roy Campbell, multi-instrumentalist Daniel Carter, bassist William Parker and drummer Rashid Bakr. It was recorded in studio in 1997 and released on the AUM Fidelity label. The music of the quartet is fully improvised.

Reception

In his review for AllMusic, Tom Schulte states: "Fascinating and richly woven, Now! is a classic mosaic of the current state of the N.Y.C. free jazz scene."
The JazzTimes review by Bill Milkowski thought that "ODIM is onto a group dynamic that is thoughtful, full of nuance and passion, sometimes provocative, sometimes poignant but never predictable."

Track listing
All compositions by Other Dimensions In Music
 "For the Glass Tear / After Evening's Orange" - 33:00 
 "Tears for the Boy Wonder (For Winston Marsalis)" - 5:26 
 "Blue Expanded"- 12:16 
 "Whispers & Cries of Change (For Departed Musical Warriors)" - 6:04
 "Dawm"- 8:23 
 "Steve's Festive Visions Revisited" - 8:20

Personnel
Daniel Carter - alto sax, tenor sax, flute, trumpet
Roy Campbell - trumpet, flugelhorn, pocket trumpet
William Parker - bass
Rashid Bakr - drums

References

1998 albums
AUM Fidelity albums
Other Dimensions In Music albums